Events from the year 1533 in France

Incumbents
 Monarch – Francis I

Events

Births
 Pierre de Gondi
 
 February 28 – Michel de Montaigne, French essayist (d. 1592)

Deaths
 Jean d'Orléans-Longueville

See also

References

1530s in France